Penzo is an Italian surname. Notable people with the surname include:

Domenico Penzo (born 1953), Italian footballer
Jacobo Penzo (born 1948), Venezuelan film director
Sara Penzo (born 1989), Italian footballer

Italian-language surnames